Bhulepur ( Bhulēpur) is a census town in Ambedaker Nagar district in the state of Uttar Pradesh, India.

Demographics
 India census, Bhulepur had a population of 5,413. Males constitute 52% of the population and females 48%. Bhulepur has an average literacy rate of 51%, lower than the national average of 59.5%; with male literacy of 56% and female literacy of 46%. 19% of the population is under 6 years of age.

References

Cities and towns in Ambedkar Nagar district